Saasveld is a village in the Dutch province of Overijssel. It is a part of the municipality of Dinkelland, and lies about 7 km north of Hengelo.

Overview 
It was first mentioned in 1145 as Saterslo. The etymology is unclear. The castle Saterslo was first mentioned in 1361. It was surrounded by swaps and often raided the countryside. After the reformation, a clandestine church was constructed inside the castle. The castle was demolished in 1818, and a church was built in Saasveld. In 1870, the gristmill Soaseler Möl was constructed.

Gallery

References

Populated places in Overijssel
Twente
Dinkelland